

Tidfrith (also Tedfrid, Tidferth or Thefridus) was a medieval Bishop of Dunwich.

Tidfrith was consecrated in 798 and died between 816 and 824.

References

External links

Bishops of Dunwich (ancient)